Ganesh Singh is an Indian politician belonging to BJP and a member of parliament from Satna (Lok Sabha constituency), Madhya Pradesh. He is elected 4 times in a row from this constituency (14th Lok Sabha, 15th Lok Sabha, 16th Lok Sabha & 17th Lok Sabha).

Early life and education
Ganesh Singh was born on 2 July 1962 in Gram Panchyat Khamahariya, Satna district, Madhya Pradesh State. He is the second of seven children born to Kamal Bhan Singh and Phoolmati Singh.

He started is political career as a general secretary of law college then becoming president of law college, he came close to socialist leaders of janta party and started working with them. He was also heading socialist youth of  Madhya Pradesh State in 1989, he contested Zilla panchayat member elections in 1994 and won by huge margin, again in 1999 he became member of Zilla panchayat of Satna this time he became chairman of Zilla panchayat Satna with minister of state in charge. He is known for development in Vindhya region, he worked hard for the development of gram panchayats and providing the basic facilities of health, sanitation, education, irrigation, infrastructure at panchayat level, functioning of panchayats, providing drinking water, developing dams and small ponds. After seeing all his work public wanted him see in bigger role therefore he contested Lok Sabha elections in 2004 and won with huge margin of 85,000 and after that never looked back. 

He did his Bachelor of Arts (BA) in 1981, Master of Arts (MA) in 1984, L.L.B in 1986, All the degrees from Awadhesh Pratap University, Rewa district, [Madhya Pradesh State].

Positions held

Awards
Honored with Bharat Gaurav Award 2021

References

External links
 Members of Fourteenth Lok Sabha - Parliament of India website

Living people
1962 births
Bharatiya Janata Party politicians from Madhya Pradesh
India MPs 2004–2009
People from Satna district
India MPs 2009–2014
Lok Sabha members from Madhya Pradesh
India MPs 2014–2019
Madhya Pradesh district councillors
India MPs 2019–present